Edwardsiana is a genus of true bugs belonging to the family Cicadellidae.

The species of this genus are found in Europe, Australia and Northern America.

Species:
 Edwardsiana alcorni Christian, 1954 
 Edwardsiana alnicola (Edwards, 1924)

References

Cicadellidae
Hemiptera genera